Bernhard Viiding (7 June 1932 – 10 March 2001) was an Estonian journalist, prosaist and poet.

Bernard Viiding was born in Valjala-Ariste, on the island of Saaremaa. In 1957 he graduated from Tartu University in Estonian literature. 1958-1968 he worked at the board of the newspaper Rahva Hääl. 1968-1984 he was the responsible editor of the newspaper Televisioon, and he worked also at Estonian Television as an compiler of cultural programs. 1991-1994 he was the executive director of the journalism company Viser.

Works

 Kurist (1985)
 Vastuvõtuõhtu (1988)
 Metsavenna elu (1991)
 poetry of collection: Tähe tüdruk (1998)
 poetry of collection: Laev kaindlus (1998)
 poetry of collection: Katsu ilma kartsata elu peale minna (1999)
 poetry of collection: Punane must (2000)

References

1932 births
2001 deaths
Estonian journalists
Estonian dramatists and playwrights
20th-century Estonian poets
Estonian male poets
University of Tartu alumni
People from Saaremaa Parish
Burials at Rahumäe Cemetery